Hillcrest Academy (formerly Iowa Mennonite School) is an independent, Christian school near Iowa City, Iowa in  Kalona, Iowa, established in 1945.

Theology 

At Hillcrest Academy, Jesus is the center of their faith. Community is the center of their lives, and reconciliation is the center of their work. The values of understanding God’s unconditional love, respect for others, and a humble attitude of service are an integral part of the Hillcrest Academy educational experience. Partnering with families and the church to educate students with a Biblical worldview is central to what the school is.

Athletics 
Hillcrest Academy's mascot is the Ravens. Hillcrest Academy is a member of the Iowa High School Athletic Association (IHSAA), the Iowa Girls High School Athletic Union (IGHSAU), and the Southeast Iowa Superconference (SEISC). The Ravens have 42 state appearances, including 16 state championships since they sanctioned athletics in 1972 .

See also
List of high schools in Iowa

References

External links 
 

Private high schools in Iowa
Mennonite schools in the United States
Schools in Washington County, Iowa
Christian schools in Iowa
1945 establishments in Iowa